Nau is a river of Baden-Württemberg and Bavaria, Germany. It is a left tributary of the Danube near Günzburg.

See also
List of rivers of Baden-Württemberg
List of rivers of Bavaria

References

Rivers of Baden-Württemberg
Rivers of Bavaria
Rivers of Germany